Schaum may refer to:
 Hermann Rudolph Schaum (181965), German entomologist
 John W. Schaum (190588), American pianist, composer and tutor
 Schaum (manufacturer), defunct automobile manufacturer
 Schaum's Outlines, teaching text supplement